The 155th Armored Brigade Combat Team is a brigade combat team of the Mississippi Army National Guard.

The brigade was formed in 1973 as the separate 155th Armored Brigade from the 1st Brigade, 30th Armored Division during a National Guard reorganization.  It became the 155th Armored Brigade Combat Team following the 2006 United States Army reorganization into modular brigade combat teams.

History

Origins 
While the units assigned to the 155th ABCT vary in seniority, the brigade itself traces its lineage to 16 March 1951 when it was constituted in the Mississippi Army National Guard as the Headquarters and Headquarters Company (HHC) of the 108th Armored Cavalry Group, before being organized and federally recognized on 12 April 1951, based at Tupelo.  On 1 November 1953 the group was redesignated as the 108th Armor Group. The group was combined with the 750th Tank Battalion and newly organized units to form the 108th Armored Cavalry on 1 November 1955; the HHC of the group became the Headquarters Company of the 108th Armored Cavalry. On 1 May 1959 the company was redesignated as a troop. In order to restore order during the Ole Miss riot of 1962, the company, alongside the Mississippi National Guard, were ordered into active federal service on 30 September of that year, being released from active federal service on 23 October and reverting to state control.

On 15 February 1968, the company was reorganized and redesignated as the HHC of the 1st Brigade, 30th Armored Division.

Formation and subsequent history 
The brigade became the 155th Armored Brigade on 1 November 1973 when the 30th Armored was split up into separate brigades. 30th Armored assistant commander Brigadier General Guy J. Gravelee Jr. became the first 155th commander, and it took the number of the 155th Infantry Regiment, the oldest Mississippi National Guard unit, which traced its lineage back to 1798. It consisted of the 1st Battalion, 155th Infantry Regiment, the 1st and 2nd Battalions of the 198th Armor Regiment, the 2nd Battalion, 114th Field Artillery Regiment, Troop A, 98th Cavalry (the former Troop C, 1st Squadron, 230th Cavalry), and the 106th Support Battalion.

The 155th Armored Brigade was mobilized for the Gulf War on 7 December 1990, but remained stateside and was demobilized on 14 May 1991. The 155th Armored Brigade became an Enhanced Separate Brigade in 1993 to provide a flexible reinforcement to active Army units during wartime. The Enhanced Separate Brigades receive specialized training and higher priority than other National Guard units for personnel, equipment and other resources during peacetime.  Organized as a powerful independent striking force, the brigade consisted of two armor battalions, a mechanized infantry battalion, a field artillery battalion, an engineer battalion, and a support battalion along with an armored cavalry troop, an air defense battery, and a military intelligence company. In 1998 the 155th Separate Armored Brigade became the largest and most powerful of the National Guard's Enhanced Separate Brigades with the attachment of the newly reactivated 1st Squadron, 108th Armored Cavalry Regiment.  Given these units, the Brigade was well postured to conduct offensive and defensive combat operations.

The brigade deployed to Iraq in support of Operation Iraqi Freedom III from August 2004 to January 2006. During this tour of duty, the 155th HBCT suffered 15 fatalities. The brigade served under the II Marine Expeditionary Force.  After its return from Iraq the brigade began its conversion into a modular heavy brigade combat team.

In 2009, the brigade was deployed again to Iraq in support of Operation Iraqi Freedom 9.2. In March 2018, the 155th left for a three-month training period at Fort Bliss with the 177th Armored Brigade, prior to a nine-month deployment to support Operation Spartan Shield from Camp Buehring in Kuwait. The 155th relieved the 2nd Brigade Combat Team, 1st Armored Division there on 15 July, the first National Guard armored brigade combat team to deploy for Operation Spartan Shield. While the brigade remained headquartered at Camp Buehring, elements of the brigade were deployed to Syria as part of Operation Inherent Resolve by November, according to an article in The New Yorker.

155th ABCT organization

Headquarters 155th Armored Brigade Combat Team, Tupelo, Mississippi
Headquarters and Headquarters Company (HHC), 106th Brigade Support Battalion (BSB), Hattiesburg, Mississippi
 Company A, Magee, Mississippi
 Detachment 1, Taylorsville, Mississippi
 Detachment 2, Prentiss, Mississippi
 Company B, Laurel, Mississippi
 Company C, Crystal Springs, Mississuppi
HHC, 150th Engineer Battalion, Meridian, Mississippi
 Detachment 1, Carthage, Mississippi
 Detachment 2, Quitman, Mississippi
 Company A, Canton, Mississippi
 Detachment 1 (UAS), Camp Shelby
 Company B, Lucedale, Mississippi
 Forward Support Company, Echo Company 106th BSB,  Brookhaven, Mississippi
HHC, 2nd Battalion, 114th Field Artillery Regiment, Starkville, Mississippi
 Battery A, Columbus, Mississippi
 Detachment 1, Ackerman, Mississippi
 Battery B, Kosciusko, Mississippi
 Detachment 1, Winona, Mississippi
 Forward Support Company, Foxtrot Company 106th BSB, Louisville, Mississippi
 Detachment 1, Eupora, Mississippi
HHC, 1st Battalion, 155th Infantry Regiment, McComb, Mississippi
 Detachment 1,Tylertown, Mississippi
 Company A, Biloxi, Mississippi
 Company B, Poplarville, Mississippi
 Company C, Kiln, Mississippi
 Forward Support Company, India Company 106th BSB,  Brookhaven, Mississippi
Headquarters and Headquarters Troop, 1st Squadron, 98th Cavalry Regiment, Amory, Mississippi
 Troop A, Pontotoc, Mississippi
 Troop B, Booneville, Mississippi
 Troop C, Fulton, Mississippi
 Detachment 1, Iuka, Mississippi
 Forward Support Company, Delta Company 106th BSB, Corinth, Mississippi
 Detachment 1, Gloster, Mississippi
 Detachment 2, Collins, Mississippi
HHC, 2nd Battalion (Combined Arms), 198th Armor Regiment, Senatobia, Mississippi
 Detachment 1, Batesville, Mississippi
 Company A, Hernando, MS
 Detachment 1, Holly Springs, Mississippi
 Company B, Greenwood, Mississippi
 Detachment 1, Drew, Mississippi
 Company C, Oxford, Mississippi
 Company D, Indianola, Mississippi
 Forward Support Company, Hotel Company 106th BSB, Grenada, MS
 Detachment 1, Charleston, Mississippi
 Detachment 2, Cleveland, Mississippi
HHC, 1st Battalion, 635th Armor Regiment, Kansas City, Kansas
 Detachment 1, Junction City, Kansas
 Company A, Emporia, Kansas
 Company B, Lenexa, Kansas
 Company C, Wichita, Kansas
 Forward Support Company, Golf Company 106th BSB, Manhattan, Kansas
 Detachment 1, Lawrence, Kansas
 Detachment 2, Wichita, Kansas

Unit coats of arms
  98th Cavalry Regiment
  106th Brigade Support Battalion
  114th Field Artillery Regiment
  137th Infantry Regiment
  150th Engineer Battalion
  155th Infantry Regiment
  198th Armor Regiment

See also

 36th Infantry Division (United States)
 Armored Brigade Combat Team
 Camp Shelby
 FOB Dogwood
 FOB Duke
 FOB Iskandariyah
 FOB Kalsu
 Iraq War order of battle

References

Citations

Bibliography 
 

Armor 999 155
Armor 999 155
999 155
Military units and formations established in 1951
1951 establishments in Mississippi